Liskincon is a townland in County Tyrone, Northern Ireland. It is situated in the barony of Omagh East and the civil parish of Termonmaguirk and covers an area of 96 acres. 

The name derives from the Irish: Lios Cinn Con (fort of the dog's head).

In 1841 the population of the townland was 70 people (12 houses) and in 1851 it was 52 people (11 houses). 

The townland contains one Scheduled Historic Monument: a Rath (grid ref: H5629 6763).

See also
List of townlands of County Tyrone
List of archaeological sites in County Tyrone

References

Townlands of County Tyrone
Archaeological sites in County Tyrone
Civil parish of Termonmaguirk